Shellburne is an unincorporated community in New Castle County, Delaware, United States. Shellburne is located east of Shipley Road at Weldin Road to the northeast of Wilmington.

References 

Unincorporated communities in New Castle County, Delaware
Unincorporated communities in Delaware